Superstar Limo was a dark ride that opened in February 2001 in Disney California Adventure at the Disneyland Resort in Anaheim, California. The ride received a negative reception from park guests, and was closed in January 2002. It was replaced by an attraction based on Disney·Pixar's 2001 film Monsters, Inc. called Monsters, Inc. Mike & Sulley to the Rescue!, which opened in January 2006.

History
The original concept for the attraction was to make riders into celebrities attempting to evade paparazzi on a wild high-speed ride through Hollywood. Reportedly, video clips of Michael Eisner (in his official role at the time as Disney chairman and chief executive officer) would have book-ended the ride. At the start, he would greet riders as they arrived at Los Angeles International Airport, remind them they had not yet signed their big contract with Disney, and promise he would be waiting at Grauman's Chinese Theatre with the contract after they escaped the paparazzi. At the end, he would appear again to politely explain the riders had been caught by paparazzi cameras and therefore the contract was void. Riders would then exit into the attached gift shop, where tabloid newspapers featuring their photographs (as taken during the chase) would be available for purchase.

The unexpected death of Princess Diana in a car crash in Paris on August 31, 1997 forced Walt Disney Imagineering to radically redesign the ride. Since paparazzi had been following Diana at the time of her crash, a ride built around the tendency of paparazzi to chase celebrities at high speed was now considered inappropriate. Eisner was replaced with a fictional Hollywood agent, and the ride was dramatically slowed down. Visual gags intended to be absorbed at high speed no longer made sense, so the ride was filled with celebrity figures to compensate for the change in pacing. Construction of Superstar Limo would officially begin in the spring of 1999.

Superstar Limo was situated in the Hollywood Pictures Backlot area and was one of the original attractions featured on the park's opening day on February 8, 2001. It was the park's only dark ride at the time of its opening. The celebrity figures were stylized and caricatured. Though most of them had moving arms and heads, Disney's life-like Audio-Animatronics technologies were not used in the attraction.

The attraction closed in January 2002, due to negative reception from guests, making it the park's first attraction to permanently close. One idea that was reportedly considered was to re-theme the attraction as Goofy's Superstar Limo. However, the plan never came to fruition. Another reported idea was to change the attraction into Miss Piggy's Superstar Limo, featuring The Muppets, but these plans were once again dropped. The building remained unused until it was surrounded by construction walls in March 2005. It has since been replaced by an attraction based on Disney·Pixar's Monsters, Inc. entitled Monsters, Inc. Mike & Sulley to the Rescue!, which opened on January 23, 2006. The Monsters, Inc. ride uses the same track and vehicles as Superstar Limo, with the limos repainted and redressed as taxicabs.

In the 2019 documentary series The Imagineering Story, Bruce Vaughn, Chief Creative Executive (2007–2016, 2023–present) of Walt Disney Imagineering, described the creation of Superstar Limo:

Synopsis
The attraction's purple "stretch limo" ride vehicles took riders through a cartoony rendition of Hollywood. Riders were introduced to animated figures modeled in the likeness of celebrities. The celebrities in the attraction were Joan Rivers (appearing only in puppet-form on TV screens in the attraction's queue), Regis Philbin, Melanie Griffith, Antonio Banderas, Cindy Crawford, Tim Allen, Jackie Chan, Drew Carey, Cher, and Whoopi Goldberg. A Hollywood talent agent named Swifty La Rue (portrayed by a puppet) appeared infrequently on small in-seat video screens, reminding the riders not to be late to their movie premiere.

The story of the attraction placed the guest (rider) as Hollywood's newest celebrity, starting out at Los Angeles International Airport and then boarding a limousine taking them through a variety of locations and situations on the way to the premiere of their new movie at Grauman's Chinese Theatre. Locations included the greater Los Angeles and Hollywood areas including Rodeo Drive, the Sunset Strip, Bel Air, Malibu, the interior of a soundstage, Grauman's Chinese Theatre, and a billboard that displayed an image captured of the guests. The ride ends with the talent agent declaring to the riders that their movie was a success and they are a superstar.

Reception
Superstar Limo was criticized as lacking and poor in concept.

In an early review of California Adventure in The Boston Globe, Anne Chalfant stated: "Kids will also like Superstar Limo, in the Hollywood Pictures Backlot area. Here you play the star, riding in your purple limo past a few audio-animatronic Hollywood celebrities. Adults will notice, however, that other painted plywood characters and sets are about on a par with college theater constructions." Similarly, James Sterngold of The New York Times called it "probably the shlockiest attraction in the new park."

An article by David Rorden in the Longview Daily News said: "I think they should change the name of this ride from Superstar Limo to 'It's a Shill World.' The space would be better devoted to something more entertaining, such as an Audioanimatronic dentist doing root canals on all Imagineers who came up with the idea for Superstar Limo."

See also
List of former Disney California Adventure attractions

References

Amusement rides introduced in 2001
Amusement rides that closed in 2002
Amusement rides manufactured by Ride & Show Engineering, Inc.
Former Walt Disney Parks and Resorts attractions
Disney California Adventure
2001 establishments in California
2002 disestablishments in California
Dark rides
Hollywood, Los Angeles in fiction
California in fiction